Aitor Hernández Gutiérrez (born 24 January 1982) is a Spanish road and cyclo-cross cyclist.

Major results

Cyclo-cross

1997–1998
 3rd National Junior Championships
2001–2002
 3rd National Under-23 Championships
2010–2011
 2nd Ispasterko Udala Sari Nagusia
2011–2012
 2nd Ispasterko Udala Sari Nagusia
 2nd Asteasuko Ziklo-Krossa
2012–2013
 1st  National Championships
 1st Igorre
 1st Karrantza
 1st Valencia
 1st Ispasterko Udala Sari Nagusia
 2nd Asteasuko Ziklo-Krossa
2013–2014
 1st Igorre
 1st Karrantza
 1st Valencia
 2nd National Championships
 3rd Ispasterko Udala Sari Nagusia
2014–2015
 1st  National Championships
 1st Karrantza
 1st Valencia
2015–2016
 1st Karrantza
2016–2017
 1st Trofeo Joan Soler
 3rd Basqueland Ziklokrosa
 3rd Asteasuko Ziklo-krosa
 3rd Gran Premi Les Franqueses del Valles
 3rd Trofeo Ayuntamiento de Muskiz
 3rd Laudio
2017–2018
 2nd Trofeo Joan Soler
 2nd Elorrioko Basqueland Ziklokrosa
 3rd National Championships
 3rd Karrantza
 3rd Laudio
 3rd Valencia
 3rd Trofeo San Andres
2018–2019
 3rd Elorrioko Basqueland Ziklokrosa

Road

2004
 10th Giro delle Colline del Chianti
2005
 9th Overall Euskal Bizikleta
2006
 Tour de France
 Combativivity award Stage 20
2007
 1st  Mountains classification, Vuelta al País Vasco
2009
 Vuelta a España
Held  for Stage 5
2010
 8th Overall Tour du Haut Var

Grand Tour general classification results timeline

External links

1982 births
Living people
People from Ermua
Cyclists from the Basque Country (autonomous community)
Spanish male cyclists
Sportspeople from Biscay